Chris Haggard and Peter Nyborg were the defending champions, but competed this year with different partners. Haggard teamed up with Tom Vanhoudt and lost in the semifinals to Pablo Albano and Cyril Suk, while Nyborg teamed up with Aleksandar Kitinov and also lost in the semifinals to Joshua Eagle and Andrew Florent.

Albano and Suk won the title by defeating Eagle and Florent 6–3, 3–6, 6–3 in the final.

Seeds
All seeds received a bye to the second round.

Draw

Finals

Top half

Bottom half

References

External links
 Official results archive (ATP)
 Official results archive (ITF)

Austrian Open Kitzbühel
2000 ATP Tour